Mahallat Menouf is a village in the Gharbia Governorate of Egypt.

Etymology 
The village was formerly known as Minuf as-Sufla. It's derived from its Coptic name Panouf Khit and was used to indicate its location downriver in relation to the flow of the Nile River, a common way of identifying regions in Egypt. This name served to distinguish it from another city called Minuf al-Ulyah or "the upper Minuf".

The Coptic name "Panouf" have originated from the Ancient Egyptian name "pꜣ-jw-nfr", meaning "the good island". The Greek name for the city, Onouphis Kato, is also derived from the Egyptian name.

References 

Populated places in Gharbia Governorate